Egide Fologne (1830–1919) was a Belgian entomologist who specialised in microlepidoptera.

He was a member of the Société entomolologique de Belgique (Royal Belgian Entomological Society).

Works
Partial list

Fologne, E. 1860. Lépidoptères et chenilles observés en Belgique. Annales de la Société Entomologique Belge 4: 108-112.
Fologne, E. 1863. Addenda au catalogue des Lépidoptères de Belgique. Annales de la Société entomologique de Belgique 7:87–93.

References
Gaedicke in Groll, E. K. (Hrsg.): Biografien der Entomologen der Welt : Datenbank. Version 4.15 : Senckenberg Deutsches Entomologisches Institut, 2010.
Wiki Arts Kuleuven

Belgian entomologists
Belgian lepidopterists
1830 births
1919 deaths